Cartosio is a comune (municipality) in the Province of Alessandria in the Italian region Piedmont, located about  southeast of Turin and about  southwest of Alessandria.

Cartosio borders the following municipalities: Castelletto d'Erro, Cavatore, Malvicino, Melazzo, Montechiaro d'Acqui, Pareto, and Ponzone.

References

Cities and towns in Piedmont